Demon's Dance is an album by American saxophonist Jackie McLean recorded in 1967 for Blue Note, but not released until 1970. It features McLean in a quintet with trumpeter Woody Shaw, pianist LaMont Johnson, bassist Scotty Holt and drummer Jack DeJohnette.

Reception
The AllMusic review by Steve Huey stated: "The record retreats a bit from McLean's nearly free playing on New and Old Gospel and 'Bout Soul, instead concentrating on angular, modal avant bop with more structured chord progressions... While Demon's Dance didn't quite push McLean's sound the way its two predecessors had, there was no sign that the altoist was beginning to run out of creative steam".

Track listing
All compositions by Jackie McLean, except as indicated.
 "Demon's Dance" - 7:09
 "Toyland" (Cal Massey) - 5:24
 "Boo Ann's Grand" (Woody Shaw) - 6:57
 "Sweet Love of Mine" (Shaw) - 6:04
 "Floogeh" - 5:23
 "Message From Trane" (Massey) - 5:29

Personnel 
Muaucians
 Jackie McLean - alto saxophone
 Woody Shaw - trumpet, flugelhorn
 LaMont Johnson - piano
 Scotty Holt - bass
 Jack DeJohnette - drums

Production
 Francis Wolff – producer
 Rudy Van Gelder – engineer (recording)
 Bob Venosa – design
 Mati Klarwein – artwork
 Leonard Feather – liner notes

References

1970 albums
Blue Note Records albums
Jackie McLean albums
Albums recorded at Van Gelder Studio
Albums produced by Francis Wolff
Albums with cover art by Mati Klarwein